FELDA Lok Heng is a settlement town in Kota Tinggi District, Johor, Malaysia.

List of settlements
FELDA Lok Heng Barat
FELDA Lok Heng Selatan
FELDA Lok Heng Timur
FELDA Lok Heng Utara (tiada penduduk dan kawasan tersebut dijadikan kawasan pertanian setempat)

Federal Land Development Authority settlements
Kota Tinggi District
Towns in Johor